{{DISPLAYTITLE:Sialyl-Lewis X}}

Sialyl LewisX (sLeX), also known as cluster of differentiation 15s (CD15s) or stage-specific embryonic antigen 1 (SSEA-1), is a tetrasaccharide carbohydrate which is usually attached to O-glycans on the surface of cells. It is known to play a vital role in cell-to-cell recognition processes. It is also the means by which an egg attracts sperm; first, to stick to it, then bond with it and eventually form a zygote. The discovery of the essential role that this tetrasaccharide plays in the fertilization process was reported in August 2011.

Sialyl Lewis X is also one of the most important blood group antigens and is displayed on the terminus of glycolipids that are present on the cell surface. The sialyl Lewis X determinant, E-selectin ligand carbohydrate structure, is constitutively expressed on granulocytes and monocytes and mediates inflammatory extravasation of these cells. Resting T- and B-lymphocytes lack its expression and are induced to strongly express sialyl Lewis X upon activation. The sialyl Lewis X determinant is expressed preferentially on activated Th1 cells but not on Th2 cells.

Structure
Sialyl-Lewis X is a tetrasaccharide composed of a sialic acid, fucose and an N-acetyllactosamine. Its systematic name is 5-acetylneuraminyl-(2-3)-galactosyl-(1-4)-(fucopyranosyl-(1-3))-N-acetylglucosamine (Neu5Acα2-3Galβ1-4[Fucα1-3]GlcNAcβ). In humans, according to Table 1 and Fig.1 it is synthesized by four fucosyltransferases: FUT3, FUT5, FUT6 and FUT7. The other three enzymes of the sialyltransferase family ST3GAL3, ST3GAL4, and ST3GAL6 participate in the synthesis of the Sialyl-Lewis X precursor.

Function

Leukocyte homing
Sialyl-Lewisx is important in leukocyte tethering and rolling. Leukocytes move through the blood stream and then tether themselves to the endothelial wall and roll along the endothelial tissue to determine if they want to leave the bloodstream to get to necessary tissue. Sialyl-Lewisx is a necessary partner for the three selectins that bind the leukocyte and endothelial cells. When sialyl-Lewisx is part of an O-glycan and attached to CD34 it can then bind to L-selectin. For the binding to L-selectin to occur sialyl-Lewisx must undergo sulfation. For sialyl-Lewisx to bind to P-selectin, an O-linked glycan near the N-terminus of P-Selectin Glycoprotein Ligand-1 (PSGL-1) is modified with sialyl-Lewisx and in combination with nearby tyrosine residues modified with sulfate, forms the binding contact for P-selectin. For sialyl-Lewisx to bind to E-selectin it can be part of either an N-linked or O-linked glycan attached to cell surface glycoproteins such as PSGL-1, CD43 or CD44. This sialyl-Lewisx mediated binding to selectins allows circulating leukocytes to stick to and roll along endothelial cells lining blood vessels thereby enabling the leukocytes to accumulate at a site of vascular inflammation.

Fertilization
Sialyl-Lewisx allows a sperm cell to recognize and fertilize an egg cell. For fertilization to occur, human sperm must bind to the zona pellucida (ZP), the translucent matrix covering the human egg composed of four glycoproteins ZP1, 2, 3, and 4, and transit through the matrix in order to fuse with the oocyte. Human ZP is coated with highly dense N- and O-glycans that are terminated with the sialyl-Lewisx sequence. The hemizona assay, which assesses sperm-ZP binding by counting the number of sperm bound to hemispheres of bisected nonliving human eggs in vitro, revealed that as little as 0.5 mM sialyl-Lewisx inhibits sperm-ZP binding by 63%. Furthermore, adding purified and solubilized ZP3 or ZP4 from the human oocyte dose-dependently inhibits sperm-ZP binding in the hemizona assay.  Such evidence suggest that the early steps of human sperm-egg binding may be mediated by lectins for sialyl-Lewisx present on human sperm.

Clinical significance

Leukocyte adhesion deficiency

Defective synthesis of the sialyl Lewis X antigen results in immunodeficiency (leukocyte adhesion deficiency type 2). Defective synthesis can be caused by the loss of fucosyltransferase, impairing the glycosylation of the glycosphingolipid. Sialyl Lewis x is being researched for detection and treatment of immune disorders because of its presence on leukocytes.

Blood cancers
Sialyl-Lewisx mediates phagocytosis and chemotaxis, found on neutrophils; expressed in patients with Hodgkin disease, some B-cell chronic lymphocytic leukemias, acute lymphoblastic leukemias, and most acute nonlymphocytic leukemias. CD15 is present on almost all Reed–Sternberg cells, including their rare mononuclear variants, and, as such, can be used in immunohistochemistry to identify the presence of such cells in biopsies. The presence of these cells is diagnostic of Hodgkin's lymphoma. Reed-Sternberg cells display a characteristic pattern of Sialyl-Lewisx (CD15) positivity, with membranous staining combined with staining of the Golgi apparatus. Immunohistochemical panels for the diagnosis of Hodgkins disease typically employ CD15 along with CD30 and CD45; the latter does not stain Reed-Sternberg cells, but does stain almost all other lymphoid cells. Sialyl-Lewisx is also present in about 50% of adenocarcinoma cells and can be used to distinguish such conditions from mesothelioma, which is typically negative.

Cancer metastasis
Sialyl-Lewisx plays a critical role in cancer metastasis, facilitating the extravasation of cancer cells out of the bloodstream while they are moving through the body. Its expression is related to tumor stage, recurrence, and overall patient survival. Therefore, sialyl Lewis x is being used as a target in studies to fight tumors and cancer cell growth. It has been shown that there is frequent overexpression of sialyl Lewis x on cancer cells and is found on both N-glycan and O-glycans. Sialyl Lewis x is being researched with CD markers to find new ways to create biosensors for cancer cells. Also, it is being used in new ways to target cancer cells specifically for cancer treatment.

In vitro fertilization

Sialyl-Lewisx is being used to achieve greater rates of fertilization of eggs in women by coating the eggs with sialyl Lewis x.

Immunity and inflammation
It plays a key role in the inflammatory response and may be used to increase the leukocyte response to infections. Sialyl Lewis x is also an inflammation-associated antigen on liver cells. It becomes over expressed on diseased liver cells and can be used as a way to detect liver disease in a patient.

MERS coronavirus binding
In June 2019, before the onset of the COVID-19 pandemic, the sulfated sialyl-Lewis X oligosaccharide (particularly with α2,3 linkages) receptor was found to be the preferred binding site, both in humans and in dromedary camels, for the coronavirus causing Middle East Respiratory Syndrome (MERS), the sixth coronavirus to be described.

History
The term Lewis in its name comes from the name of a family of people who suffered from a red blood cell incompatibility. The studies done on these individuals' red blood cells led to the discovery of sialyl Lewis X. Sialyl Lewis x is a very important red blood cell antigen present on the glycolipids on the plasma membrane of the cell.

Its localization on the cell surface of cells led to its alternative nomenclature as a cluster of differentiation. Clusters of differentiation are a naming system devised in 1982 to classify cell-surface antigens on leukocytes identified via monoclonal antibodies. Sialyl Lewis X was assigned the name CD15.

See also 
 CA19-9 (Sialyl-Lewis A)

References

Further reading
 
 
 
 
 Essentials of Glycobiology 3rd Edition, Chapter 14: "Structures Common to Different Glycans" https://www.ncbi.nlm.nih.gov/books/NBK453042/#_Ch14_s2_
 Stephen J Isles, Molecule of the Month: Sialyl Lewis X

Amino sugars
Tetrasaccharides
Acetamides
Clusters of differentiation
Human reproduction
Tumor markers